Nicola Payne may refer to:

 Nicola Payne, List of unsolved murders in the United Kingdom, went missing 1991, arrests made 2013
 Nicola Payne (rower) (born 1966), New Zealand rower
 Nicola Payne (cricketer) (born 1969), international cricketer for the Netherlands and New Zealand
 Nicola Payne (tennis), British tennis player in 1999 Wimbledon Championships – Women's Singles Qualifying and 2001 ITF Women's Circuit